Da Capo Press is an American publishing company with headquarters in Boston, Massachusetts. It is now an imprint of Hachette Books.

History
Founded in 1964 as a publisher of music books, as a division of Plenum Publishers,  it had additional offices in New York City,  Philadelphia, Los Angeles, and Emeryville, California. The year prior, Da Capo Press had net sales of over $2.5 million.

Da Capo Press became a general trade publisher in the mid-1970s. It was sold to the Perseus Books Group in 1999 after Plenum was sold to Wolters Kluwer. In the last decade, its production has consisted of mostly nonfiction titles, both hardcover and paperback, focusing on history, music, the performing arts, sports, and popular culture. In 2003, Lifelong Books was founded as a health and wellness imprint. When Marlowe & Company became part of the imprint in 2007, Lifelong's range was expanded to include the New Glucose Revolution series and numerous diabetes titles, as well as books on healthful cooking, psychology, personal growth, and sexuality. In 2009 the company placed the science portion of the book Jetpack Dreams on the web for free.

In April 2016, Da Capo Press was acquired by the Hachette Book Group as part of Hachette's purchase of the Perseus Books Group. After the sale, sister imprint Seal Press became a Da Capo imprint. In 2018, Da Capo became an imprint of Hachette Books and Seal became an imprint of Basic Books.

References

External links 
 

Book publishing companies based in Massachusetts
Companies based in Cambridge, Massachusetts
Publishing companies established in 1964